Giuseppe Maria Doria (12 July 1730 – 9 March 1816) was a Genoese nobleman, elected 183rd Doge of the Republic of Genoa. He was the last member of the house Doria to serve in that office.

References

Bibliography

External links 
Giuseppe Maria Doria on Biographic Dictionary of the Italians (in Italian)

1730 births
1816 deaths
18th-century Doges of Genoa